Mark Warren (born 4 January 1960, Walsall, West Midlands) is an English former football referee, and one of only ten from the United Kingdom to have been a match official in a FIFA World Cup Final.

Career
A police officer by profession, Warren began refereeing in lower leagues in 1978, and was appointed to the list of assistant referees for the Football League in 1991.

He had been an international assistant referee since 1994 when he was selected as an English representative at the FIFA World Cup in France in 1998. He was appointed to the final and ran the line, along with South African Achmat Salie, to the referee, the late Said Belqola.

In addition Warren was the assistant referee in the FA Cup Final in 1995, the 1997 League Cup Final, the 1994 Division One Play-Off Final and the 1994 Charity Shield match.

After assisting in the World Cup Final, Warren graduated to become a Football League referee, leaving the international assistants' list at the end of that year. He had seven years in the middle before stepping down in 2005. He returned to running the line in the Premier League, and refereed just one match in 2005–06, the Football Conference North game between Stafford Rangers and Northwich Victoria on 31 December 2005.

He subsequently retired from top-class officiating, as confirmed by his absence from the lists of Football League referees and assistants for season 2007–08.

References

External links
Mark Warren Referee Statistics at soccerbase.com

1960 births
British police officers
English football referees
FIFA World Cup Final match officials
Living people